Carleton Rode is a village and civil parish in Norfolk, England. It is situated approximately five miles south-east of Attleborough. In the 2011 Census, Carleton Rode was recorded as having a population of 785 people in 324 households.

History
Carleton Rode's name is of Anglo-Saxon and Viking origin and derives from an amalgamation of the Old English and Old Norse for a settlement of free presents belonging to the de Rode family.

In the Domesday Book, Carleton Rode was recorded as a settlement of 43 households in the hundred of Depwade. The land of the village was divided in ownership between King William, Alan of Brittany, William de Warenne, Roger Bigod and Eudo, son of Spirewic.

Carleton Rode was the site of a semaphore telegraph station which connected the Admiralty in London to the fleet in Great Yarmouth.

Amenities
Carleton Rode Primary School claims to be the oldest non-fee paying in Norfolk and received a 'Good' rating from Ofsted in 2021.

Sport
The GP2 Series racing team, iSport International has its factory and headquarters in Carleton Rode.

War Memorial
Carleton Rode's War Memorial is located in ..... Churchyard and lists the following names for the First World War:
 Second-Lieutenant Hugh R. Cholmeley (1891-1915), 42nd Brigade, Royal Field Artillery
 Sergeant Ernest E. Bennington (1886-1916), 7th Battalion, Border Regiment
 Corporal Ernest Calton (1897-1918), 9th Battalion, Essex Regiment
 Gunner Ernest C. Colman (1890-1916), 6th (Howitzer) Brigade, Royal Regiment of Canadian Artillery
 Gunner Oswald H. Balls (1891-1917), 94th (Siege) Battery, Royal Garrison Artillery
 Private Wilfred Breeze (d.1918), Bedfordshire Regiment
 Private James W. Baker (1891-1917), 43rd (Cameron Highlanders) Battalion, Canadian Army
 Private Fred Burt (d.1916), 2nd Battalion, Royal Norfolk Regiment
 Private Bertie Barber (1892-1916), 7th Battalion, Royal Norfolk Regiment
 Private James Brown (d.1916), 9th Battalion, Royal Norfolk Regiment
 Private Leonard H. Foster (d.1916), 9th Battalion, Royal Norfolk Regiment
 Private Wesley H. W. G. Chilvers (1898-1918), 7th Battalion, Queen's Royal Regiment (West Surrey)
 Reverend Hatfield A. W. Back (1891-1917), HMS Vanguard

References

External links

Villages in Norfolk
Civil parishes in Norfolk